The Southgate Community School District is a school district in Southgate, Michigan. 

The district serves the entire city of Southgate, Michigan and Allen Park south of the Sexton-Kilfoil Drain.  The Board of Education office is located at 13940 Leroy in Davidson Middle School.

History 
During the summer of 1982, the Heintzen and McCann school districts merged into one and was named the Southgate Community School District.

References

External links 
 

School districts in Michigan
Education in Wayne County, Michigan
Southgate, Michigan
1982 establishments in Michigan
School districts established in 1982